The Federation of School Sports Association of the Philippines, abbreviated as FESSAP is a university sports federation based in the Philippines established in 1999. It is recognized by the Commission on Higher Education since 1999 and member of the International University Sports Federation (FISU) since 2009. The university sports body is the sole recognized body for university sports in the Philippines by FISU. FESSAP is also a member of the Asian University Sports Federation since 2000.

In 2013, the University Athletic Association of the Philippines (UAAP) disputed the membership of FESSAP in FISU. The UAAP asserts that from the 1967 to 2007 the UAAP has been sending athletes to the Universiade, which is organized by FISU. In a meeting by the FISU Executive Committee in Trento, Italy held in December 8, 2013, FESSAP's membership was confirmed by FISU.

Members
Basketball Association of the Philippines
Bohol School Amateur Athletic Association
Cavite Athletic Association of the Philippines
Cebu Schools Athletic Foundation, Inc.
Cebu Weightlifting Association 
Cheng Hua Athletic Association
Filipino-Chinese Amateur Athletic Federation
Laguna Colleges & Universities Athletic Association
Leyte Amateur Athletic Association
Metropolitan Amateur Sports Association 
National Capital Region Athletic Association
National Ladies Beach Volleyball League 
Negros Oriental Colleges Athletic Association
Philippine Athletics Track and Field Association
Philippine Federation of Body Builders
Philippine Inter-School Sport Association
Philippine Inter-Schools Colleges & Universities Athletic Association
Philippine Schools Volleyball Association
Philippine Wushu Colleges & Clubs Association (PWCCA) 
Private Schools Athletic Association
State Colleges University Athletic Association
Table Tennis Association for National Development (TATAND) 
Universities & Colleges Athletic Association of Pangasinan
Zamboanga City Sports Athletic Development Foundation

See also
Philippine Olympic Committee
Philippine Sports Commission

References

External links
Official Website
Profile of FESSAP in FISU

Student sport in the Philippines
1999 establishments in the Philippines
Organizations based in Manila